Mark Knight, also known as TDK and Madfiddler, is a British musician, video game music composer and sound designer. He started out writing chiptune and module file music in the Amiga demoscene, and began his games industry career as a composer in 1992. He continued until 2000 when he moved to sound design, and since 2014 has had a split role as a sound designer and composer culminating by going self employed in 2017.

Biography
Born in 1973, in Brighton, East Sussex in England, his grandfather started teaching him the violin when he was 6. At 10 years old he was given a Commodore 64 home computer and took an interest in electronic music. Whilst studying in college he began writing music on the Amiga, releasing music within the demoscene. Having been refused a university place to study Music Production in 1992, he was given the opportunity to arrange the Wing Commander soundtrack to the Commodore Amiga home computer which led him to full-time employment with the developer Mindscape.

Having left Mindscape in 1997, Knight wrote the soundtrack for Duke Nukem: Total Meltdown before accepting a position at Bullfrog Productions, a development company owned by Electronic Arts, working on games such as Dungeon Keeper 2, Populous: The Beginning and Theme Park World – which won a BAFTA for Best Sound.

In 2000, Mark changed career direction and lead the sound design team on the EA Sports F1 series, stating that "If truth be told however, it was a simple choice of either F1 or Harry Potter". He left EA in 2003, and after spending time at Visual Science he joined Codemasters in 2007 working on their DiRT, F1 and GRID franchises.

Knight has performed on the electric violin with the folk punk band Tricks Upon Travellers (1994–2000), K-Passa (2000–2001, 2008–present), Blue Horses (2002–2003), 4-4-2 (2004), Laura Kenny (2006), Silver Dogs (2006–2007), Bleeding Hearts (2009–2011) and has worked as a session musician for bands such as Pepe Deluxé, The Divine Comedy, C64 Audio.com, and Frost*. He also administers the Fiddle and Alternative Strings Forum.

In 2012 Knight released his first TDK chiptune album, and continues to compose music in this style and in 2015 Knight announced his return to video game composition with F1 2015. He was nominated for Best Western Game Composer (2015) at the Annual Game Music Awards.

Knight resigned from Codemasters in September 2017 and is now running his Audio Production company, SONiC FUEL.

He contributed demo-music and patches to the Commodore 64 SID chip emulator, inSIDious, from Impact Soundworks in 2020  and in 2021 he returned to the demoscene by contributing the music for the Melon Design demo, Cortez.

Personal life
Knight lives in Warwickshire, England.

Discography

Video games
{| class="wikitable"
!Year
!Title
!Notes
|-
|rowspan="3"|1992||Guy Spy and the Crystals of Armageddon||
|-
|Wing Commander ||Amiga version
|-
|Outlander||rowspan="2"|SNES version
|-
|rowspan="10"|1993|||Mario's Time Machine
|-
|Alfred Chicken||With David Whittaker
|-
|Pierre le Chef is... Out to Lunch||rowspan="10"|
|-
|Battleship
|-
|D/Generation
|-
|Evasive Action
|-
|Liberation: Captive 2
|-
|Overkill/Lunar C
|-
|Out to Lunch
|-
|Sim Life
|-
|rowspan="3"|1994|||DragonLore
|-
|Sim City 2000
|-
|Battletoads||Amiga version
|-
|1995||Cyberspeed||rowspan="2"|
|-
|rowspan="3"|1996||Supersonic Racers
|-
|Warhammer: Shadow of the Horned Rat||With James Hannigan
|-
|MegaRace 2||Special thanks
|-
|1997||Duke Nukem: Total Meltdown||rowspan="10"|
|-
|rowspan="3"|1998||Populous: The Beginning
|-
|Theme Park World
|-
|Warhammer: Dark Omen
|-
|1999||Dungeon Keeper 2
|-
|rowspan="3"|2000||Formula One 2000
|-
|Formula One 2000 CE
|-
|Superbikes 2000|-
|rowspan="3"|2001||Formula One 2001|-
|Harry Potter and the Philosopher's Stone|-
|Quake 3: Revolution||Audio Production
|-
|rowspan="3"|2002||Formula One 2002||Sound design
|-
|Harry Potter and the Chamber of Secrets||Additional Sound Design and Dialogue Editing
|-
|Shox||Technical Audio Lead
|-
|rowspan="3"|2003||Formula One 2003||rowspan="2"|
|-
|Harry Potter: Quidditch World Cup|-
|F1 Career Challenge||Audio lead
|-
|2004||Sudeki||Sound design
|-
|rowspan="2"|2007||Crysis||rowspan="4"|
|-
|The Witcher|-
|rowspan="3"|2008||Metal Gear Solid Mobile|-
|So Blonde|-
|Race Driver: GRID||Audio lead
|-
|rowspan="2"|2009||Colin McRae: DiRT 2||Lead Audio Designer
|-
|F1 2009||
|-
|rowspan="1"|2010||F1 2010||Lead Audio Sound Designer
|-
|rowspan="4"|2011|||F1 2011||Lead Audio Sound Designer
|-
|DiRT 3||Lead Audio Designer
|-
|Dizzy Prince of the Yolkfolk||
|-
|FortressCraft||With Arjan Kroes
|-
|rowspan="3"|2012||DiRT Showdown||rowspan="2"|Audio Group Lead
|-
|F1 2012|-
|F1 Race Stars||Group Lead Audio Designer
|-
|rowspan="3"|2013|||GRID 2|-
|Colin McRae Rally||Special thanks
|-
|F1 2013||Audio Group Lead
|-
|rowspan="3"|2014|||F1 2014|-
|GRID Autosport||Group Lead Audio Designer
|-
|Toybox Turbos||Additional Composer
|-
|rowspan="4"|2015||F1 2015||Audio Group Lead and Composer
|-
|Dirt Rally||Group Lead Audio Designer
|-
|Overlord: Fellowship of Evil||With Michiel van den Bos
|-
|D/Generation HD|| Composer
|-
|rowspan="3"|2016||F1 2016||Principal Audio Designer and Composer
|-
|Shadow Warrior 2||Instrumentalists & Vocals
|-
|Micro Machines||Additional Composer
|-
|rowspan="3"|2017||F1 2017||Composer
|-
|Flight Sim World||Composer
|-
|Funfair.io||Composer/Sound Designer
|-
|rowspan="1"|2018||BeamNG.drive||Audio Designer
|-
|rowspan="1"|2019||NASCAR Heat 4||Audio Designer
|-
|rowspan="1"|2020||NASCAR Heat 5||Uncredited use of 2019 audio
|-
|rowspan="1"|2021||Turbo Tomato||Composer
|-
|rowspan="1"|2022||World of Outlaws||Audio Designer
|-
|rowspan="5"|Unreleased||Carmageddon TV||rowspan="5"|
|-
|.ComBots|-
|Mario's Mission Earth|-
|Road Rash|-
|Velocity|}

Music releasesCyberspeed Unleashed (2011)FortressCraft Credits (2011)Reawakening (2012)D/Generation HD (2015)The General (2019)Project Hubbard: Escape to New Rob (2019)ME! (2019)Retrospect (2020)

Violin sessions4-4-2 – Come on EnglandBjørn Lynne – The Gods AwakenC64Audio – Back in Time 3Frost* – The Dividing LineFrost* – Falling SatellitesJames J Turner – How Could We Be Wrong?Ian Livingstone – Big Fat Gypsy WeddingsK-Passa – Born AgainMichał Cielecki - Shadow Warrior 2Pepe Deluxe – BeatitudePress Play on Tape – Home ComputerSilverDogs – SilverDogsThe Divine Comedy – CasanovaThe Giallos Flame – House at the Edge of the DarkThis Morning Call – DesertedTomorrows Ancestor – Live at StainsbyTricks Upon Travellers – The Last Fish SupperTricks Upon Travellers – Where the Skeletons DanceTricks Upon Travellers – Acoustic Live and Uncut''

References

External links

TDK website
SONiC FUEL website
madfiddler website
Gamesounds website 
AMP profile website

1973 births
Living people
British rock violinists
British male violinists
Chiptune musicians
Demosceners
British sound designers
Tracker musicians
Video game composers
Video game musicians
People from Brighton
Musicians from Brighton and Hove
21st-century violinists
21st-century British male musicians